The following elections occurred in the year 1953.

Africa
 1953 Federation of Rhodesia and Nyasaland election
 1953 South African general election
 1953 Southern Rhodesian federation referendum
 1953 South-West African legislative election
 1953 Sudanese parliamentary election

Asia
 1953 Japanese general election
 1953 Kathmandu municipal election
 1953 Philippine House of Representatives elections
 1953 Philippine Senate election
 1953 Philippine general election
 1953 Philippine presidential election

Australia
 1953 Australian Senate election
 1953 Kahibah state by-election
 1953 New South Wales state election
 1953 Queensland state election
 1953 South Australian state election
 1953 Western Australian state election

Europe
 1953 Danish Folketing election
 1953 Danish general election
 1953 Gibraltar general election
 1953 Icelandic parliamentary election
 1953 Italian general election
 1953 Maltese general election
 1953 Maltese general election
 1953 Mauritian general election
 1953 Norwegian parliamentary election
 1953 Portuguese legislative election

Austria
 1953 Austrian legislative election

France
 1953 French presidential election

Germany
 1953 West German federal election

United Kingdom
 1953 Barnsley by-election
 1953 Northern Ireland general election

United Kingdom local

English local
 1953 Bermondsey Borough election
 1953 Southwark Borough election

Central America
 1953 Guatemalan parliamentary election

North America

Canada
 1953 Canadian federal election
 1953 British Columbia general election
 1953 Edmonton municipal election
 1953 Manitoba general election
 1953 Nova Scotia general election
 1953 Toronto municipal election
 1953 Winnipeg municipal election

United States
 1953 Pittsburgh mayoral election
 1953 South Carolina's 4th congressional district special election

Oceania

Australia
 1953 Australian Senate election
 1953 Kahibah state by-election
 1953 New South Wales state election
 1953 Queensland state election
 1953 South Australian state election
 1953 Western Australian state election

See also

 
1953
Elections